Vasyl Ivanovych Leskiv (born 20 December 1963) is a Soviet and Ukrainian former football player and manager.
A veteran of Karpaty Lviv and Lviv, he has played more than 150 official matches for each of these clubs. Top scorer of Lviv in all Ukrainian championships, he scored 36 goals.

Career
He studied in “Lviv” CYSS-4. His first coach was Ihor Yevstahiyovych Kulchytsky. After three seasons at Torpedo (Lutsk) and one year at Podillya (Khmelnytsky), the midfielder moved to the newly restored FC Karpaty Lviv in 1989. Together with the Lviv team, Leskiv won gold medals in the second Soviet league in 1991 and played in the first independent championships. In 1993 he joined the Israeli club Maccabi Petah Tikva F.C.

From 1995 to 2001 he spent 6 seasons for FC Lviv in the first league. He immediately became a regular player and regularly scored penalties. He became the team's top scorer in the 1998–99 championship — 12 goals. In total, Vasyl Leskiv played 217 matches for FC Lviv in the championships of Ukraine.

Since 2005 he has been the head coach of the Pustomyty amateur team (Lviv region).
Works as a coach at CYSS "Karpaty" (Lviv). In December 2008, he agreed to head the amateur club Horodok from the city of the same name in the Lviv region.

References

External links 
 
 
 Виступи Леськіва у чемпіонатах СРСР (klisf.info) 
 Михалюк Ю. А., Яремко І. Я. Футбольний клуб «Карпати». Футбол-90. Довідник-календар. — Львів, 1990
 Пилипчук П. «Карпати» від А до Я (1963—2005). — Львів: Галицька видавнича спілка, 2006. — 154 с. ISBN 966-7893-51-0

1963 births
Living people
People from Lviv Oblast
Soviet footballers
Ukrainian footballers
Ukrainian football managers
FC Volyn Lutsk players
FC Podillya Khmelnytskyi players
FC Lviv (1992) players
FC Karpaty Lviv players
FC Karpaty-2 Lviv players
FC Karpaty-3 Lviv players
Maccabi Petah Tikva F.C. players
Ukrainian Premier League players
Ukrainian First League players
Ukrainian Second League players
Liga Leumit players
Ukrainian expatriate footballers
Expatriate footballers in Israel
Ukrainian expatriate sportspeople in Israel
Association footballers not categorized by position